The Anglican Church of St Mary at Upper Swell in the Cotswold District of Gloucestershire, England was built in the 12th century. It is a Grade I listed building.

History

The church was built in the 12th century and in the 13th the chancel was added. During the 15th and early 16th century the nave was revised.

The parish is part of the Stow on the Wold, Condicote & The Swells benefice within the Diocese of Gloucester.

Architecture

The cotswold stone building has a stone slate roof. It consists of a three-bay nave and two-bay chancel with a south porch. The bellcote on the west gable has two bells.

Inside the church is a 15th-century font and a piscina in the chancel. There is a Norman doorway with a carved tympanum. There is a mass dial on the jamb of the porch door. The organ was built by Nicholson & Co Ltd in 1872.

References

Church of England church buildings in Gloucestershire
Grade I listed churches in Gloucestershire
Cotswold District